Boris Orlando Powell (December 19, 1964 - April 5, 2022) was an American former professional boxer who competed from 1991 to 2001. His nickname is Bo 'The Champ' Powell. As an amateur, he was the National Golden Gloves Heavyweight champion in 1989.

Amateur career
In 1989, Powell won the St. Louis Golden Gloves followed by the National Golden Gloves.

Professional career 
Powell turned pro in 1991 and won his first 23 fights before losing to John Ruiz in 1995. He retired in 2001 after a five fight win streak.

Personal life 
Powell was a 1984 graduate of Vashon High School.

In October 2020, Powell was diagnosed with the neurological disease ALS. A local store owner at the St. Vincent de Paul thrift store assisted Powell's family with obtaining a motorized wheelchair, allowing Powell to stay mobile while he combatted his condition. In April 2021, the Jim Schoemehl Run for ALS selected Powell as the annual run's beneficiary.

Powell died of the disease on April 5, 2022.

Career statistics 

|-
|align="center" colspan=8|30 Wins (17 knockouts, 13 decisions), 2 Loss (0 knockouts, 2 decisions)
|-
| align="center" style="border-style: none none solid solid; background: #e3e3e3"|Result
| align="center" style="border-style: none none solid solid; background: #e3e3e3"|Record
| align="center" style="border-style: none none solid solid; background: #e3e3e3"|Opponent
| align="center" style="border-style: none none solid solid; background: #e3e3e3"|Type
| align="center" style="border-style: none none solid solid; background: #e3e3e3"|Round
| align="center" style="border-style: none none solid solid; background: #e3e3e3"|Date
| align="center" style="border-style: none none solid solid; background: #e3e3e3"|Location
| align="center" style="border-style: none none solid solid; background: #e3e3e3"|Notes
|-align=left
|Win
|
|align=left| Marvin Hunt
|TKO
|X
|03/11/2001
|align=left| Saint Louis, Missouri, U.S.
|align=left|
|-
|Win
|
|align=left| Ken Woods
|PTS
|X
|11/07/2000
|align=left| Saint Louis, Missouri, U.S.
|align=left|
|-
|Win
|
|align=left| Greg Suttington
|UD
|X
|16/10/1999
|align=left| Merrillville, Indiana, U.S.
|align=left|
|-
|Win
|
|align=left| Artis Pendergrass
|TKO
|X
|6/05/1999
|align=left| Tacoma, Washington, U.S.
|align=left|
|-
|Win
|
|align=left| Mike DeVito
|KO
|X
|23/10/1998
|align=left| Chester, West Virginia, U.S.
|align=left|
|-
|Loss
|
|align=left| Robert Hawkins
|UD
|X
|31/03/1998
|align=left| Saint Louis, Missouri, U.S.
|align=left|
|-
|Win
|
|align=left| Richard Mason
|UD
|X
|12/09/1997
|align=left| Northlake, Illinois, U.S.
|align=left|
|-
|Win
|
|align=left| Stanley Wooten
|KO
|X
|23/01/1997
|align=left| Saint Louis, Missouri, U.S.
|align=left|
|-
|Loss
|
|align=left| John Ruiz
|UD
|X
|04/02/1995
|align=left| Las Vegas, Nevada, U.S.
|align=left|
|-
|Win
|
|align=left| David Cherry
|KO
|X
|15/12/1994
|align=left| Chicago, Illinois, U.S.
|align=left|
|-
|Win
|
|align=left| Bobby Crabtree
|KO
|X
|23/09/1994
|align=left| Cicero, Illinois, U.S.
|align=left|
|-
|Win
|
|align=left| Kimmuel Odum
|PTS
|X
|25/07/1994
|align=left| Joliet, Illinois, U.S.
|align=left|
|-
|Win
|
|align=left| West Turner
|UD
|X
|07/04/1994
|align=left| Joliet, Illinois, U.S.
|align=left|
|-
|Win
|
|align=left| Ron Gullette
|KO
|X
|17/02/1994
|align=left| Joliet, Illinois, U.S.
|align=left|
|-
|Win
|
|align=left| Brian Morgan
|PTS
|X
|17/12/1993
|align=left| Countryside, Illinois, U.S.
|align=left|
|-
|Win
|
|align=left| Danny Blake
|PTS
|X
|19/11/1993
|align=left| Countryside, Illinois, U.S.
|align=left|
|-
|Win
|
|align=left| Phil Scott
|TKO
|X
|22/10/1993
|align=left| Countryside, Illinois, U.S.
|align=left|
|-
|Win
|
|align=left| James Wilder
|KO
|X
|17/09/1993
|align=left| Countryside, Illinois, U.S.
|align=left|
|-
|Win
|
|align=left| George Harris
|KO
|X
|28/08/1992
|align=left| Countryside, Illinois, U.S.
|align=left|
|-
|Win
|
|align=left| Kevin Poindexter
|TKO
|X
|26/08/1992
|align=left| Countryside, Illinois, U.S.
|align=left|
|-
|Win
|
|align=left| Marshall Tillman
|UD
|X
|11/04/1992
|align=left| Las Vegas, Nevada, U.S.
|align=left|
|-
|Win
|
|align=left| Marion Wilson
|UD
|X
|27/03/1992
|align=left| Atlantic City, New Jersey, U.S.
|align=left|
|-
|Win
|
|align=left| James Wilder
|KO
|X
|28/02/1992
|align=left| Countryside, Illinois, U.S.
|align=left|
|-
|Win
|
|align=left| Eddie Taylor
|RTD
|X
|17/01/1992
|align=left| Peoria, Illinois, U.S.
|align=left|
|-
|Win
|
|align=left| Robert Smith
|UD
|X
|13/12/1991
|align=left| Countryside, Illinois, U.S.
|align=left|
|-
|Win
|
|align=left| Anthony Jackson
|KO
|X
|22/11/1991
|align=left| Peoria, Illinois, U.S.
|align=left|
|-
|Win
|
|align=left| Charlie Harris
|KO
|X
|11/11/1991
|align=left| Fort Lauderdale, Florida, U.S.
|align=left|
|-
|Win
|
|align=left| Jerry Jones
|MD
|X
|08/08/1991
|align=left| Atlantic City, New Jersey, U.S.
|align=left|
|-
|-
|Win
|
|align=left| Marion Wilson
|UD
|X
|13/06/1991
|align=left| Philadelphia, Pennsylvania, U.S.
|align=left|
|-
|Win
|
|align=left| Kevin Casimier
|TKO
|X
|03/05/1991
|align=left| Saint Louis, Missouri, U.S.
|align=left|
|-
|Win
|
|align=left| Martin Leach
|KO
|X
|24/02/1991
|align=left| Lexington, Kentucky, U.S.
|align=left|
|-
|Win
|
|align=left| Stanley Wright
|UD
|X
|15/02/1991
|align=left| Saint Louis, Missouri, U.S.
|align=left|
|}

References

External links 
 
 

1964 births
2022 deaths
American male boxers
Heavyweight boxers
Southpaw boxers
National Golden Gloves champions
Boxers from St. Louis
Deaths from motor neuron disease